The 1952 United States Senate election in Connecticut was held on November 4, 1952. Incumbent Democratic Senator William Benton, who won a special election to complete the term of retiring Senator Raymond Baldwin, was defeated by Republican William A. Purtell after serving only 2 years.

General election

Candidates
William Benton, incumbent Senator since 1949 (Democratic)
Vivien Kellems, industrialist, inventor, and tax protester (Independent Republican)
Jasper McLevy, Mayor of Bridgeport and perennial candidate for statewide office (Socialist)
William A. Purtell, businessman and candidate for Governor in 1950

Campaign
During the campaign, Brien McMahon, the Class III Senator from Connecticut, died. Governor John Davis Lodge appointed Purtell, already the Republican nominee for this Class I seat, to serve as interim Senator in McMahon's place until a special election could be held.

Purtell supported General Eisenhower's campaign platform against "communism, corruption, and Korea." Benton accused Purtell of being so conservative that he "makes Bob Taft look like a left-wing New Dealer."

Results

Notes

References

Connecticut
1952
1952 Connecticut elections